This article presents an incomplete list of short stories by Robert Sheckley, arranged alphabetically by title.

Short stories
 "A Strange But Familiar Country" (2002, BIGNews (also on Internet) 2002/9)
 "A Suppliant in Space" (1973, The Robot Who Looked Like Me)
 "A Thief in Time" (1954, Citizen in Space)
 "A Ticket to Tranai" (1955, Citizen in Space)
 "A Trick Worth Two of That" (2001, Uncanny Tales)
 "A Wind Is Rising" (1957, Notions: Unlimited)
 "An Infinity of Angels" (2001, Official Angel Website (Internet))
 "Accept No Substitutes" (1958, Infinity SF 1958/3)
 "Agamemnon's Run" (2002, Uncanny Tales)
 "Alien Starswarm" (1990?, Portland, OR: DimeNovels 1990)
 "Aliens: Alien Harvest" (1995?, Bantam Spectra 1995) - see Aliens (novel series)
 "All the Things You Are" (1956, Pilgrimage to Earth)
 "Alone at Last" (1957, Shards of Space)
 "Amsterdam Diary" (1989?, Semiotext(e) #14 1989)
 "Ask a Foolish Question" (1953, Citizen in Space)
 "Aspects of Langranak" (Can You Feel Anything When I Do This?)
 "At the Conference of Birds" (1987, The Collected Short Stories of Robert Sheckley Book Five)
 "Bad Medicine" (1956, Pilgrimage to Earth)
 "Beetle" (2003, BIGNews (also on Internet) 2003/9)
 "Beside Still Waters" (1953, Untouched by Human Hands)
 "Body Game" (1978, Omni Dec 1978)
 "Breakout" (1990?, The War Years #2: The Siege of Arista, ed. Bill Fawcett, Penguin/Roc 1990)
 "Budget Planet" (1968, F&SF Mar 1968)
 "Can You Feel Anything When I Do This?" (1969, Can You Feel Anything When I Do This?)
 "Carhunters of the Concrete Prairie" (1989?, Foundation's Friends, ed. Martin H. Greenberg, Tor 1989)
 "Carrier" (1954?, If Apr 1954)
 "Celestial Visitations" (1980, Omni Nov 1980)
 "Citizen in Space" (1955, Citizen in Space. Also known as "Spy Story")
 "Change from a Silver Dollar" (1954, The Saint Detective Magazine 1954/12)
 "Charter for Murder" (1958, Short Stories (UK) 1958/12)
 "Closed Circuit" (1953, Science Fiction Adventures 1953/9)
 "Coast to Coast" (1953, Collier's 1953/7)
 "Conquerors Planet" (1954, Fantastic Universe 1954/10)
 "A Conversation With The West Nile Virus" (2002, BIGNews (also on Internet) 2002/12 and 2003/1)
 "Conversations on Mars" (2004, BIGNews (also on Internet) 2004/7)
 "Conversation on Mars" (2005, Amazing 2005/3)
 "Cordle to Onion to Carrot" (1969, Can You Feel Anything When I Do This?)
 "Cornfield" (2002, BIGNews (also on Internet) 2002/11)
 "Cost of Living" (1952, Untouched by Human Hands)
 "Dawn Invader" (1957, Notions: Unlimited)
 "Deadhead Deadhead" (1955, Pilgrimage to Earth)
 "Death of the Dreammaster" (1989, The Further Adventures of Batman, ed.  Martin H. Greenberg, 1989)
 "Death Freaks" (1989, Prophets in Hell, ed. Janet Morris, Baen 1989. Also known as "Heroes in Hell")
 "Death Wish" (1956, Galaxy 1956/6 as Ned Lang)
 "Deep Blue Sleep" (1999, Uncanny Tales)
 "Devildeal" (1994?, Deals with the Devil, ed. Mike Resnick, Martin H. Greenberg & Loren D. Estleman, DAW 1994)
 "Diaghilev Plays Riverworld" (1993?, Quest to Riverworld, ed. Philip José Farmer, Warner Questar 1993)
 "Dial-a-Death" (1987, The Collected Short Stories of Robert Sheckley Book Five)
 "Diplomatic Immunity" (1953, The People Trap)
 "Disposal Service" (1955, Pilgrimage to Earth)
 "Disquisitions on the Dinosaur" (1993, Dinosaur Fantastic, ed. Mike Resnick & Martin H. Greenberg, DAW 1993)
 "Divine Intervention" (1989, The Collected Short Stories of Robert Sheckley Book Five)
 "Doctor Zombie and His Little Furry Friends" (Can You Feel Anything When I Do This?)
 "Double Indemnity" (1957, Notions: Unlimited)
 "Down the Digestive Tract and into the Cosmos with Mantra, Tantra and Specklebang" (1971, Can You Feel Anything When I Do This?)
 "Dreamworld" (1968, The People Trap. Revised from "The Petrified World")
 "Dukakis and the Aliens" (1992, Uncanny Tales, Alternate Presidents)
 "Duplication" (1959?, Playboy May 1959)
 "Early Model" (1956, Pilgrimage to Earth)
 "Earth, Air, Fire and Water" (1955, Pilgrimage to Earth)
 "Eastern Exposures" (1981?, Omni Feb 1981)
 "Emissary from a Green and Yellow World" (1998, Uncanny Tales)
 "End City" (1974, The Robot Who Looked Like Me. Two versions exist, with different endings.)
 "Fear in the Night" (1952, Pilgrimage to Earth)

 "Feeding Time" (1953, Notions: Unlimited)
 "Final Examination" (1952, Imagination 1952/5)
 "Fishing Season" (1953, The People Trap)
 "Five Minutes Early" (1982, Is THAT What People Do?)
 "Fool's Mate" (1953, Shards of Space)
 "Forever" (1959, Shards of Space)
 "Fortunate Person" – see "The Luckiest Man in the World"
 "Game: First Schematic" (1971?, Can You Feel Anything When I Do This?)
 "George and the Boxes" (1995, Never published in English, first published in Polish; Russian translation published in Новые Миры Роберта Шекли, Vol. 2. Полярис, 1998)
 "Ghost V" (1954, The People Trap)
 "Good-Bye Forever to Mr. Pain" (1979, Is THAT What People Do?)
 "Gray Flannel Armor" (1957, Notions: Unlimited)
 "Hands Off" (1954, Citizen in Space)
 "Heroes in Hell" – see "Death Freaks"
 "Hex on Hax" (1954, Planet Stories 1954/9 (Fall Issue))
 "Holdout" (1957, Notions: Unlimited)
 "How to Write Science Fiction" (1982?, Transmutations, Alexei Panshin, Elephant 1982)
 "Human Man's Burden" (1956, Pilgrimage to Earth)
 "Hunger" (2003, Stars: Original Stories Based on the Songs of Janis Ian ed. Janis Ian & Mike Resnick)
 "Hunting Problem" (1955, Citizen in Space)
 "I Can Teleport Myself to Anywhere" (1979?, Twenty Houses of the Zodiac, ed. Maxim Jakubowski, 1979)
 "I See a Man Sitting on a Chair, and the Chair is Biting His Leg" (1968, The Robot Who Looked Like Me. Collaboration with Harlan Ellison)
 "If the Red Slayer" (1959, Amazing Jul 1959; Store of Infinity)
 "In a Land of Clear Colors" (1976, New Constellations, ed. Thomas M. Disch & Charles Naylor, Harper 1976)
 "Is THAT What People Do?" (1978, The Robot Who Looked Like Me)
 "Join Now" – see "The Humours"
 "Judication" (1959?, Playboy May 1959)
 "Juleeeeeeeeeeen!" (1986, Twilight Zone Oct 1986). Collaboration with Jay Rothbell Sheckley)
 "Keep Your Shape" – see "Shape"
 "Kenny" (1999, The Magazine of Fantasy and SF, 1999/10)
 "Khasara" (1989?, The Break Through, ed. David Drake & Bill Fawcett, Ace 1989) - for David Drake's Fleet series
 "Klaxon" (1988, The Fleet, ed. David Drake & Bill Fawcett, Ace 1988) - for David Drake's Fleet series
 "Legend of Conquistadors" (2003, The Magazine of Fantasy and SF 2003/4)
 "Love, Inc." – see "Pilgrimage to Earth"
 "Love Song from the Stars" (1989, Weird Tales Win 1989/90)
 "Lubrication" (1959?, Playboy May 1959)
 "M Molecule" – see "Specialist"
 "Magic, Maples, and Maryanne" (2000, Uncanny Tales)
 "Man of the Hour" (1954, Science Fiction Digest 1954/5 issue 2 of 2)
 "Mayhem Party" (1996?, The Ultimate Super-Villains, ed. Stan Lee, Boulevard 1996)
 "Meanwhile, Back at the Bromide" (1962, Is THAT What People Do?)
 "Meeting of the Minds" (1960, Shards of Space)
 "Memoir" (1986?, Worlds of If: A Retrospective Anthology, ed. Frederik Pohl, Martin H. Greenberg & Joseph D. Olander, Bluejay 1986)
 "Message from Hell" (1988, Weird Tales Winter 1988-89)
 "Message From Pluto" (2003, BIGNews (also on Internet) 2003/5)
 "Milk Run" (1954, Pilgrimage to Earth)
 "Minority Group" (1954, Fantastic Universe 1954/11)
 "Minotaur Maze" (1990?, Axolotl Press: Eugene, OR 1990)
 "Miranda" (1994?, Alternate Outlaws, ed. Mike Resnick, Tor 1994)
 "Mirror Games" (2001, Uncanny Tales)
 "Miss Mouse and the Fourth Dimension" (1982, Is THAT What People Do?)
 "Morning After" (1957, Notions: Unlimited)
 "Mrs. Donaldson's Puzzling Dream" (1957, Swank 1957/5)
 "My Trip To Mars" (2004, BIGNews (also on Internet) 2004/1)
 "Myryx" (1983?, Isaac's Universe Volume One: The Diplomacy Guild, ed. Martin H. Greenberg, Avon 1990)
 "A New Christmas Carol" (1993, Christmas Forever, ed. David G. Hartwell, Tor 1993)
 "The new Horla" (2000, F&SF, June 2000, 89/1 : 38-49)
 "Notes on the Perception of Imaginary Differences" (Can You Feel Anything When I Do This?)
 "Off-Limits Planet" (1954, Imagination 1954/5)
 "On Three Cigars" (2000, "Civil War Fantastic" ed. Greenberg 2000/7)
" "One Man's Poison" (1953, Galaxy 1953/12)
 "Onesday" (1991, Pulphouse: The Hardback Magazine Issue 10, ed. Kristine Kathryn Rusch, Pulphouse 1991)
 "Operating Instructions" (1953, Astounding 1953/5, later in Beyond the Barriers of Time and Space anthology, ed. Merril, 1954)
 "Pandora's Box — open with care" (2000, Uncanny Tales, F&SF 99/3)
 "Paradise II" (1954, Notions: Unlimited)
 "Pas de Trois of the Chef and the Waiter and the Customer" (1971, Can You Feel Anything When I Do This?)
 "Pilgrimage to Earth" (1956, Pilgrimage to Earth. Also known as "Love, Inc.")
 "Plague Circuit" (Can You Feel Anything When I Do This?)
 "A Plague of Unicorns" (1995, Peter S. Beagle's Immortal Unicorn, Vol. 2, co-edited with Peter S. Beagle; with help from Martin H. Greenberg. HarperPrism, Hardcover, October 1995)
 "Potential" (1953, Shards of Space)
 "Primordial Follies" (1998, Ma che Pianeta mi hai Fatto?, only published in translation to Italian)
 "Privilege Of Age" (2003, BIGNews (also on Internet) 2003/3)
 "Proof of the Pudding" (1952, The People Trap)
 "Prospector's Special" (1959, Shards of Space)
 "Protection" (1956, Pilgrimage to Earth)
 "Reborn Again" (2005, Imagination 2005/1 (?))
 "Redfern's Labyrinth" (The People Trap)
 "Restricted Area" (1953, The People Trap)
 "Ritual" (1953, Untouched by Human Hands. Also known as "Strange Ritual")
 "Robotgnomics" (1984?, Omni Dec 1984)
 "Robotvendor Rex" (1985, Omni Feb 1986)
 "Sarkanger" (1982? 1986?, Stardate Jan/Feb 1986)
 "Scenes from the Contest" (2005, "You Bet Your Planet" ed. Greenberg & Koren)
 "Seventh Victim" (1953, Untouched by Human Hands)
 "Seven Soup Rivers" (1995, Galaxy Jan/Feb 1995 (Issue 7))
 "Shall We Have a Little Talk?" (1965, The People Trap)
 "Shape" (1953, Untouched by Human Hands. Also known as "Keep Your Shape")
 "She Was Made for Love" (1959, Knave 1959/1 (Issue 1))
 "Shoes" (2002, The Magazine of Fantasy and SF 2002/2, also in "Mammoth Book of New Comic Fantasy" (2005) ed. Ashley, Carroll & Graf)
 "Sightseeing, 2179" (2002, Uncanny Tales)
 "Silversmith Wishes" (1977, The Robot Who Looked Like Me)
 "Simul City" (1990?, Time Gate Vol. 2: Dangerous Interfaces, ed. Robert Silverberg, Baen 1990)
 "Skulking Permit" (1954, Citizen in Space)
 "Slaves of Time" (1974, The Robot Who Looked Like Me)
 "Sneak Previews" (1977, The Robot Who Looked Like Me)
 "Something for Nothing" (1954, Citizen in Space)
 "Spacemen in the Dark" (1953, Climax 1953/4)
 "Specialist" (1953, Untouched by Human Hands. Also known as "M Molecule")
 "Spectator Playoffs" (1987, Night Cry Spr 1987. Collaboration with Jay Rothbell Sheckley)
 "A Spirit of Place" (2004?, Microcosms ed. Gregory Benford)
 "Spy Story" – see "Citizen in Space"
 "Squirrel Cage" (1955, Galaxy 1955/)
 "Starting from Scratch" (1970, Can You Feel Anything When I Do This?)
 "Strange Ritual" – see "Ritual"
 "Street of Dreams, Feet of Clay" (1967, Galaxy 1968/2, later reworked into a segment of Dimension of Miracles)
 "Subsistence Level" (1954, Shards of Space)
 "Svengali in Westchester" (1959, Argosy 1959/12)
 "Syncope and Fugue" (1975, Galaxy 1975/7)
 "Tailpipe to Disaster" (Can You Feel Anything When I Do This?)
 "The Academy" (1954, Pilgrimage to Earth)
 "The Accountant" (1954, Citizen in Space)
 "The Altar" (1953, Untouched by Human Hands)
 "The Battle" (1954, Citizen in Space)
 "The Body" (1956, Pilgrimage to Earth)
 "The City of the Dead" (1994, Uncanny Tales, originally in Galaxy), three parts:
 "City of the Dead"
 "Weather Sirens"
 "Perseus"
 "The Covenant" (1960, Fantastic SF 1960/7. A round-robin novelette with Anderson, Asimov, Bloch and Leinster)
 "The Cruel Equations" (1971?, BOAC 1971; Can You Feel Anything When I Do This?)
 "The Day the Aliens Came" (1995, New Legends, ed. Greg Bear & Martin H. Greenberg, Legend 1995; Uncanny Tales)
 "The Deaths of Ben Baxter" (Store of Infinity)
 "The Deep Hole to China" (1955, Fantastic Universe 1955/6)
 "The Demons" (1953, Untouched by Human Hands)
 "The Destruction of Atlantis" (1989, The Collected Short Stories of Robert Sheckley Book Five. Also known as "The Truth About Atlantis")
 "The Disorder and Early Sorrow of Edward Moore Kennedy, Homunculus" (1992, Alternate Kennedys, ed. Mike Resnick, Tor 1992)
 "The Dream of Misunderstanding" (2002, Uncanny Tales)
 "The Dream Country" (The Crafters Book 2, ed. Christopher Stasheff & Bill Fawcett, Ace 1992)
 "The Eryx" (1998?, Lord of the Fantastic: Stories in Honor of Roger Zelazny, ed. Martin H. Greenberg, Avon Eos 1998)
 "The Eye of Reality" (1982, Omni Oct 1982)
 "The Forest on the Asteroid" (2004, The Magazine of Fantasy and SF 2004/4)
 "The Future of Sex: Speculative Journalism" (1982, Is THAT What People Do?)
 "The Future Lost" (1980, Is THAT What People Do?)
 "The Girls and Nugent Miller" (1960, Shards of Space)
 "The Gun Without a Bang" (Store of Infinity)
 "The Helping Hand" (1981, Is THAT What People Do?)
 "The Homecoming" (1989?, Buck Rogers: Arrival, ed. Anon., TSR 1989) - see Buck Rogers
 "The Hour of Battle" (Space Science Fiction Sep 1953)
 "The Humours" (Store of Infinity. Also known as "The Humors" and "Join Now")
 "The Hungry" (1954, Fantastic SF 1954/6. Revised version published in Fantastic Science Fiction 1969/8)
 "The Impacted Man" (1952, Untouched by Human Hands)
 "The Joker's War" (1990, The Further Adventures of The Joker)
 "The King's Wishes" (1953, Untouched by Human Hands)
 "The Language of Love" (1957, Notions: Unlimited)
 "The Last Days of (Parallel?) Earth" (1980, Is THAT What People Do?)
 "The Last Weapon" (1953, The People Trap)
 "The Last Word" (1985?, Omni Feb 1985)
 "The Laxian Key" (1954, The People Trap)
 "The Leech" (1952, Notions: Unlimited)
 "The Life of Anybody" (1984, Is THAT What People Do?)
 "The Lifeboat Mutiny" (1955, Pilgrimage to Earth)
 "The Luckiest Man in the World" (1955, Citizen in Space. Also known as "Fortunate Person")
 "The Machine" (1957, Fantastic Universe 1957/7)
 "The Martyr" (1957, Galaxy 1957/2)
 "The Mind-Slaves of Manitori" (1989, Uncanny Tales)
 "The Minimum Man" (Store of Infinity)
 "The Mnemone" (Can You Feel Anything When I Do This?)
 "The Mob" (1956, Infinity SF 1956/6)
 "The Monsters" (1953, Untouched by Human Hands)
 "The Mountain Without a Name" (1955, Citizen in Space)
 "The Native Problem" (1956, Notions: Unlimited)
 "The Necessary Thing" (1955, The People Trap)
 "The Never-Ending Western Movie" (1976, The Robot Who Looked Like Me)
 "The New Horla" (2000, Uncanny Tales)
 "The Obsidian Mirror" (2002, BIGNews (also on Internet) 2002/10)
 "The Odor of Thought" (1953, The People Trap)
 "The Ogre Test" (1954, Planet Stories 1954/7 (Summer Issue))
 "The Old Curiosity Shop" (2004, BIGNews (also on Internet) 2004/9)
 "The Other Mars" (1991, The Bradbury Chronicles, ed. William F. Nolan & Martin H. Greenberg, Roc 1991)
 "The Paris-Ganymede Clock" (2005, "Tales of the Shadowmen, Vol 1" ed. Lofficier)
 "The People Trap" (1968, The People Trap)
 "The Perfect Woman" (1953?, Amazing Dec 1953/Jan 54)
 "The Petrified World" (1968, Can You Feel Anything When I Do This?)
 "The Prize of Peril" (Store of Infinity)
 "The Quijote Robot" (2001, Uncanny Tales)
 "The Rabbi from Perdido" (1990, "Crazed World Construct")
 "The Refuge Elsewhere" (2003, The Magazine of Fantasy and SF 2003/5)
 "The Resurrection Machine" (1989, Time Gate, ed. Robert Silverberg, Baen 1989) - for Time Gate
 "The Robot Who Looked Like Me" (1973, The Robot Who Looked Like Me)
 "The Robotic Replacement of George" (1987, origin unknown. Collaboration with Jay Rothbell Sheckley)
 "The Same to You Doubled" (1970, Can You Feel Anything When I Do This?)
 "The Scheherezade Machine" (1991, published in Pulphouse issues: Jun 1, Jul 6, Jul 27, Aug 17, Sep 20, Oct 25, Nov 29, Dec 31, all 1991)
 "The Seal of Solomon" (1991?, The Crafters, ed. Christopher Stasheff & Bill Fawcett, Ace 1991)
 "The Shaggy Average American Man Story" (1979, Is THAT What People Do?)
 "The Shootout in the Toy Shop" (1981, Is THAT What People Do?)
 "The Skag Castle" (1956, Is THAT What People Do?)
 "The Slow Season" (1954, Shards of Space)
 "The Special Exhibit" (1953, Shards of Space)
 "The Stand on Luminos" (1992?, Battlestation Book One, ed. David Drake and Bill Fawcett, Ace 1992) - for David Drake's Fleet series
 "The Store of the Worlds" (Store of Infinity. Also known as "World of Heart's Desire")
 "The Swamp" (1981, Is THAT What People Do?)
 "The Sweeper of Loray" (1959, Shards of Space)
 "The Sympathetic Doctor" (2003, BIGNews (also on Internet) 2003/7)
 "The Tales of Zanthias" (2003, Weird Tales 2003/7)
 "The Truth About Atlantis" – see "The Destruction of Atlantis"
 "The Two Sheckleys" (2005, "Gateways" ed. Greenberg)
 "The Universal Karmic Clearing House" (1986, Uncanny Tales)
 "The Victim from Space" (1947, The People Trap)
 "There Will Be No War After This One" (1987, There Won't Be War, ed. Harry Harrison & Bruce McAllister, Tor 1991)
 "Three Cautionary Tales" (1981, Rod Serling's The Twilight Zone Magazine, April 1981), in three parts:
 "The Helping Hand"
 "The Man Who Loved"
 "The Wish"
 "Time Check for Control" (1953, Climax 1953/3. Revised version in Science Fiction Digest 1954/2)
 "Traitors' Saga" (1988, The Fleet: Counterattack, ed. David Drake & Bill Fawcett, Ace 1988) - for David Drake's Fleet series
 "Trap" (1956, Pilgrimage to Earth)
 "Triplication" (1959?, Playboy May 1959, Store of Infinity), in three short parts:
 "Judication"
 "Duplication"
 "Lubrication"
 "Tripout" (Can You Feel Anything When I Do This?)
 "Trojan Hearse" (1990, "The War Years #1: The Far Stars War" ed. Fawcett)
 "Ultimatum!" (1953, Future SF 1953/11)
 "Uncle Tom's Planet" (1954, Galaxy 1954/12)
 "Untouched by Human Hands" (1953, Astounding Science Fiction May 1953; reprinted in Untouched by Human Hands)
 "Vacation on Earth" (1983, Omni 1983/2)
 "Visions of the Green Moon" (1999, "Moon Shots" ed. Crowther & Greenberg, 1999)
 "Voices" (1973, The Robot Who Looked Like Me)
 "Warm" (1953, Untouched by Human Hands)
 "Warrior Race" (1952, Galaxy 1952/11 UK Vol:3 #3)
 "Warrior's Return" (1955, Galaxy 1955/11)
 "Watchbird" (1953, Notions: Unlimited)
 "We Are Alone" (1952, Future Nov 1952)
 "Welcome to the Standard Nightmare" (1973, The Robot Who Looked Like Me)
 "What is Life?" (1976, The Robot Who Looked Like Me)
 "What Goes Up" (1953, Science Fiction Adventures 1953/5)
 "What A Man Believes" (1953, Fantastic SF 1953/11)
 "Wild Talents, Inc." (1953, Is THAT What People Do?)
 "World of Heart's Desire" – see "The Store of the Worlds"
 "Wormworld" (1991, The Collected Short Stories of Robert Sheckley Book Five)
 "Writing Class" (1952, Imagination 1952/12)
 "Xolotl" (1991, Pulphouse: Eugene, OR 1991)
 "Zirn Left Unguarded, The Jenghik Palace in Flames, Jon Westerly Dead" (1972, The Robot Who Looked Like Me)

AAA Ace Interplanetary Decontamination Service series
 "Milk Run" (1954/9, Pilgrimage to Earth)
 "Ghost V (Galaxy 1954/10, The People Trap)
 "The Laxian Key" (Galaxy 1954/11, The People Trap)
 "Squirrel Cage" (Galaxy Jan 1955)
 "The Lifeboat Mutiny" (1955/4, Pilgrimage to Earth)
 "The Necessary Thing (Galaxy 1955/6, The People Trap)
 "The Skag Castle" (1956, Is THAT What People Do?)
 "Sarkanger" (1982? 1986?, Stardate Jan/Feb 1986)

External links
 
 Robert Sheckley Short Stories: Chronological Survey

Bibliographies by writer
Bibliographies of American writers
Science fiction bibliographies